The 2004–05 Ottawa Senators season was the 13th season of the Ottawa Senators of the National Hockey League (NHL). All games were cancelled due to the 2004–05 NHL lockout, which cancelled play for the entire League. Several of the Senators' players played for teams in European hockey leagues while some played for the Senators' American Hockey League (AHL) affiliate, the Binghamton Senators.

Off-season
On June 8, 2004, Bryan Murray of nearby town Shawville, Quebec, became the team's fifth head coach, leaving the Mighty Ducks of Anaheim where he had previously been general manager.

Like all other NHL teams, the Senators were still eligible to take part in the 2004 NHL Entry Draft and selected Andrej Meszaros in the first round, 23rd overall.

The Senators replaced the traded Patrick Lalime with Dominik Hasek as the Senators' starting goaltender. Due to this signing, centerman Jason Spezza would wear number 19, previously Hasek's number as 39.

NHL lockout

The NHL Chairman of the Board, Harley Hotchkiss was a key figure in the resolution of the labour dispute. Initially taking a low key role, Hotchkiss was thrust into the spotlight when he was invited by National Hockey League Players' Association President Trevor Linden to a last-ditch meeting in January 2005 to save the season.  While that meeting was unsuccessful in saving the season, the two would continue to meet until an agreement was finally reached on July 13, 2005.  Hotchkiss' role in the negotiations was prominently mentioned when he was voted into the Hockey Hall of Fame in 2006.

Several Senators played with the team's AHL affiliate, the Binghamton Senators, including newly-acquired goaltender Dominik Hasek, who only practiced with the group, and Jason Spezza, who played most of the season with Binghamton.

Schedule
The Senators preseason and regular season schedules were announced on July 14, 2004.

|-
| 1 || September 25 || Toronto Maple Leafs
|-
| 2 || September 26 || @ Montreal Canadiens
|-
| 3 || September 28 || Pittsburgh Penguins
|-
| 4 || September 29 || Florida Panthers
|-
| 5 || September 30 || @ Pittsburgh Penguins
|-
| 6 || October 2 || @ Toronto Maple Leafs
|-
| 7 || October 9 || Montreal Canadiens
|-

|-
| 1 || October 13 || Montreal Canadiens
|-
| 2 || October 16 || @ Toronto Maple Leafs
|-
| 3 || October 21 || Toronto Maple Leafs
|-
| 4 || October 23 || Philadelphia Flyers
|-
| 5 || October 27 || @ Carolina Hurricanes
|-
| 6 || October 28 || Los Angeles Kings
|-
| 7 || October 30 || New Jersey Devils
|-
| 8 || November 1 || Boston Bruins
|-
| 9 || November 5 || @ Washington Capitals
|-
| 10 || November 6 || New York Rangers
|-
| 11 || November 9 || Florida Panthers
|-
| 12 || November 12 || Montreal Canadiens
|-
| 13 || November 13 || @ Montreal Canadiens
|-
| 14 || November 16 || @ New Jersey Devils
|-
| 15 || November 18 || Dallas Stars
|-
| 16 || November 20 || Tampa Bay Lightning
|-
| 17 || November 24 || @ Pittsburgh Penguins
|-
| 18 || November 26 || @ Boston Bruins
|-
| 19 || November 30 || @ New York Islanders
|-
| 20 || December 2 || @ Boston Bruins
|-
| 21 || December 4 || Minnesota Wild
|-
| 22 || December 6 || @ New York Rangers
|-
| 23 || December 7 || @ Pittsburgh Penguins
|-
| 24 || December 10 || @ Atlanta Thrashers
|-
| 25 || December 11 || @ Tampa Bay Lightning
|-
| 26 || December 13 || Philadelphia Flyers
|-
| 27 || December 16 || Calgary Flames
|-
| 28 || December 18 || Boston Bruins
|-
| 29 || December 19 || @ Detroit Red Wings
|-
| 30 || December 21 || @ Nashville Predators
|-
| 31 || December 23 || @ Colorado Avalanche
|-
| 32 || December 26 || New York Islanders
|-
| 33 || December 28 || @ Washington Capitals
|-
| 34 || December 30 || Carolina Hurricanes
|-
| 35 || January 1 || Atlanta Thrashers
|-
| 36 || January 5 || @ Buffalo Sabres
|-
| 37 || January 6 || Florida Panthers
|-
| 38 || January 8 || Pittsburgh Penguins
|-
| 39 || January 10 || Toronto Maple Leafs
|-
| 40 || January 12 || @ Vancouver Canucks
|-
| 41 || January 14 || @ Calgary Flames
|-
| 42 || January 15 || @ Edmonton Oilers
|-
| 43 || January 18 || New York Rangers
|-
| 44 || January 20 || Toronto Maple Leafs
|-
| 45 || January 22 || Buffalo Sabres
|-
| 46 || January 23 || @ Chicago Blackhawks
|-
| 47 || January 25 || Pittsburgh Penguins
|-
| 48 || January 28 || @ Carolina Hurricanes
|-
| 49 || January 29 || @ Toronto Maple Leafs
|-
| 50 || February 1 || Washington Capitals
|-
| 51 || February 3 || @ New York Islanders
|-
| 52 || February 5 || San Jose Sharks
|-
| 53 || February 7 || Vancouver Canucks
|-
| 54 || February 8 || @ Buffalo Sabres
|-
| 55 || February 10 || Carolina Hurricanes
|-
| 56 || February 15 || @ Tampa Bay Lightning
|-
| 57 || February 16 || @ Florida Panthers
|-
| 58 || February 19 || @ Montreal Canadiens
|-
| 59 || February 21 || Edmonton Oilers
|-
| 60 || February 24 || Atlanta Thrashers
|-
| 61 || February 26 || Tampa Bay Lightning
|-
| 62 || February 28 || @ Philadelphia Flyers
|-
| 63 || March 3 || Boston Bruins
|-
| 64 || March 5 || New Jersey Devils
|-
| 65 || March 7 || @ Florida Panthers
|-
| 66 || March 9 || @ Atlanta Thrashers
|-
| 67 || March 11 || @ Buffalo Sabres
|-
| 68 || March 12 || @ Toronto Maple Leafs
|-
| 69 || March 15 || Montreal Canadiens
|-
| 70 || March 17 || Anaheim Mighty Ducks
|-
| 71 || March 19 || Phoenix Coyotes
|-
| 72 || March 21 || @ Boston Bruins
|-
| 73 || March 22 || @ St. Louis Blues
|-
| 74 || March 24 || @ Philadelphia Flyers
|-
| 75 || March 26 || Buffalo Sabres
|-
| 76 || March 28 || Washington Capitals
|-
| 77 || March 29 || @ New Jersey Devils
|-
| 78 || April 1 || Buffalo Sabres
|-
| 79 || April 2 || @ Columbus Blue Jackets
|-
| 80 || April 6 || @ New York Rangers
|-
| 81 || April 8 || New York Islanders
|-
| 82 || April 9 || @ Montreal Canadiens
|-

Transactions
The Senators were involved in the following transactions from June 8, 2004, the day after the deciding game of the 2004 Stanley Cup Finals, through February 16, 2005, the day the  season was officially cancelled.

Trades

Players acquired

Players lost

Signings

Draft picks
Ottawa's draft picks from the 2004 NHL Entry Draft held on June 26 and June 27, 2004 at the RBC Center in Raleigh, North Carolina.

Farm teams
 Binghamton Senators (American Hockey League)
 Charlotte Checkers (ECHL)

Notes

References

Ottawa Senators seasons
Ottawa Senators
Ottawa